Ajay Kumar (born 2 October 1962) is an officer of the Indian Administrative Service, of the batch of 1985. He served as the Defence Secretary of India. He is an alumnus of IIT Kanpur and the University of Minnesota and was awarded separate two fellowships by the University of Minnesota. 

Ajay Kumar is known for his in depth knowledge for technology and was instrumental in path breaking policy formations such as electronics manufacturing, mobile manufacturing and also played decision making role in Govt of India’s flagship Digital India program.

He is accredited to scale up defense exports to approximately 13,000 crores with the introduction of modern warfare capabilities and disruptive technologies and innovations.  He established the iDEX initiative to help create a conducive and cost-effective defense start-up ecosystem that fosters innovation and technology development.  He was in charge of Project 75I, which is developing next-generation submarines and fighters and laying the groundwork for a future marine and aerospace industrial ecosystem in India.

Education 
Kumar has a Bachelor of Technology in electrical engineering from the Indian Institute of Technology Kanpur, has a master's degree in development economics from the University of Minnesota, and has a PhD degree in business administration from the Carlson School of Management at the University of Minnesota.

In 2019, he was felicitated as a distinguished alumnus by the Indian Institute of Technology Kanpur for his professional excellence and nation-building efforts.

Career 
Kumar has served in various posts in both the Government of India and the Government of Kerala, such as Principal Secretary (Information Technology), managing director of the Kerala State Electronics Development Corporation, Secretary (Industries), managing director of the Kerala State Co-operative Agricultural and Rural Development Bank, general manager in the Kerala State Industrial Development Corporation and as the district magistrate and collector of the Palghat (now Palakkad) district in the Kerala government; and as the Defence Production Secretary, additional secretary in the Ministry of Electronics and Information Technology, joint secretary in the Department of Information Technology of the now-erstwhile Ministry of Communications and Information Technology, director in the Department of Biotechnology of the Ministry of Science and Technology and as a deputy secretary in the Department of Home of the Ministry of Home Affairs in the Indian government.

Ajay kumar spent three decade of his service with the Kerala state government where he headed three different departments.

Kumar also served as a private secretary to a minister in the Ministry of Non-Conventional Energy Sources (now Ministry of New and Renewable Energy).

Principal Secretary 
He was Principal Secretary to Government of Kerala, Information Technology Department from October 2007 to December 2010.

Joint Secretary 
Kumar held the post of Joint Secretary, Ministry of Electronics and Information Technology and additional charge of Director General at National Informatics Centre from 2010 to 2014.

Additional Secretary 
He was Additional Secretary, Ministry of Electronics and Information Technology during 2015 - 2019

Defence Production Secretary 
Kumar was appointed as the Defence Production Secretary by the prime minister-headed Appointments Committee of the Cabinet in November 2017, he assumed office on 1 December 2017. He served as Defence Production Secretary till 23 August 2019 and was succeeded by Subhash Chandra, an IAS officer  of Karnataka cadre (1986 batch).

Defence Secretary
Kumar was appointed as Union Defence Secretary on 21 August 2019, and he assumed office on 23 August 2019 when Sanjay Mitra retired. Kumar travelled to Paris along with Raksha Mantri Rajnath Singh to take delivery of first Rafale fighter jet. On 4 June 2020, Kumar tested positive for COVID-19.

Secretary, Department of Defence Production 

Defence Secretary Ajay Kumar was assigned additional charge of Secretary, Department of Defence Production on 30th Nov 2021.

Professional work 
Dr Ajay Kumar, the Defence Secretary, commissioned the Indian Coast Guard Ship (ICGS) Saksham, the fifth of the 105-metre Offshore Patrol Vessels (OPVs) class. ICGS Saksham's commissioning has enhanced the ability of the ICG to fulfill the diverse maritime tasks. 

In March 2022, he asserted that defence imports have been decreasing continuously, with the focus been given on emerging defence technologies like cyberspace and underwater warfare and enhancing R&D investments aimed at optimizing defence operations and augmenting military efficiency. 

On 20 April 2022, Kumar launched INS Vagsheer, the sixth Scorpene-class submarine under Project-75, at Mazagon Dock in Mumbai.

Honours and awards 

He received distinguished Alumni award from Indian Institute of Technology Kanpur in 2019 for the entrepreneurship excellence work. Kumar is credited for the creation of an Electronics Development Fund, which focuses on developing technology start-ups in defence sector.

Ajay Kumar was named one of the top-50 effective bureaucrats in the year 2019 in a survey conducted by Asia Post for adhering to the cardinal principles of civil service that is professionalism, anonymity, integrity and neutrality. 

 2013 - EFY - Electronics Leader of Year 
 2019  - Awarded Honorary Doctorate by Amity University, Noida
 2019 - Top 50 effective bureaucrats by Asia Post 
 2019 - Distinguished Alumni, IIT Kanpur
 2021 - Fellow of Indian National Academy of Engineering in 2021

References

External links 
 
 

1962 births
Living people
IIT Kanpur alumni
University of Minnesota alumni
Carlson School of Management alumni
Indian Administrative Service officers
People from Uttar Pradesh
Defence Secretaries of India
District magistrate